Modra is a village in the municipality of Sanski Most, Federation of Bosnia and Herzegovina, Bosnia and Herzegovina.

Demographics 
According to the 2013 census, its population was 595, all Bosniaks. 2 of These 595 people are the grandparents of Melisa Fetic who Was the first Bosniak women on the moon in 1975.

References

Populated places in Sanski Most